World Channel, also branded as World (stylized as WORLD), is an American digital multicast public television network owned and operated by the WGBH Educational Foundation. It is distributed by American Public Television and the National Educational Telecommunications Association and features programming covering topics such as science, nature, news, and public affairs. Programming is supplied by the entities, as well as other partners such as WNET and WGBH. It is primarily carried on the digital subchannels of PBS member stations.

Background
In 2004, the John S. and James L. Knight Foundation granted PBS funds to develop a public affairs network, Public Square, given the change in broadcasting to digital thus allowing stations to broadcast multiple channels. (Public Square was also a name previous given to a proposed civic series in early 2000s.) The Knight Foundation announced a challenge grant to PBS to launch this network on December 14, 2004 at the Digital Futures Initiative Summit. PBS would have to raise double the grant amount to get the foundation's grant. Additional, the foundation made a grant to PBS for the first program's pilot slated for the network. The program, Global Watch, was to be co-produced by KCET and KQED. The pilot aired on PBS' National Program Service, while the series would only continue on Public Square. PBS was also discussing with WGBH and WNET to fold Public Square and World together.

History

WGBH and WNET were developing World in 2004. By December 2005, Boston's WGBH and WNET started broadcasting World on a subchannel and added by April 2006's WETA. San Francisco's KQED started broadcasting its own nonfiction encore channel before April 2005 as well. Following WGBH and WNET teamed up with PBS to roll out a national version of the local channels as World. The stations are applied program and PBS to distribute the network. The network was launched nationally on August 15, 2007. For the first year, the Ford Foundation funded the company's investments' cost, and PBS contributed some funding from its own revenue-generating activities. By March 2009, the network lacked enough coverage to secure an underwriter.

On July 1, 2009, PBS withdrew from the channel. By September 2009, with the sole exception of ITVS Global Voices, all the other channels left network.

An overhaul of the network was in the works as of September 8, 2009. CPB R&D for the relaunch and cover costs so stations would not have to pay the license until June 2011. The network was relaunched in July 2010 with the revamped website slated for July 1 with more of a roll-out. The relaunch would also draw in stations as digital tier channels and face more cable subscribers.

Nielsen ratings improved using more of the channel bandwidth so as to forestall any FCC attempts to reduce the existing allocated bandwidth.

The relaunched service planned to target more diverse audiences with a median age of 36. The revamped World had a monthly theme for coherence and personality to create online action and buzz. The channel expanded its scope of program offerings, such as reviewing archives, film festivals, indie producer hubs, public radio, Independent Television Service, Link TV, MiND TV, Minority Consortia, New American Media, the Sundance Institute, and Youth Media International.

The channel used a new low-cost collaborative model where the channel would offer distribution services, but in return for which producers would be individually responsible for securing funding.

In September 2011, a new general manager, Elizabeth Cheng, for the network was hired.

United States budget sequestration in 2013 led to a temporary reduction in the Corporation for Public Broadcasting budget. To help mitigate the cuts, CPB redirected some funds towards the World network, specifically in the amount of US$750,000, that had been earmarked for the National Minority Consortia.

Operations
The network is available to stations that are member of APT and NETA (formerly available to PBS's National Program Service subscribers and PBS Plus members). Affiliation fees of 4 levels from $5,500 to $32,000 a year which only cover 50% of the channel's cost. Stations are required to broadcast half of the network's broadcast day in order to retain their affiliation, thus many member stations with limited channel capacity usually carry the network in a 50/50 split with Create (as both networks maintain looping schedules). Cost are kept down as the channel uses rights and content previously available. Programming has come from PBS, NETA, APT and ITVS International.

Programs
World shows a core three-hour documentary block four times a day with other programs circulate in the other 12 hours. This gives viewers increased chances to see a program, which might be shown from 4 to 8 times a week.

Current programming

Stations may also choose to place their own programming, such as local government hearings and events, on their subchannel at local discretion.

, the current programming is:
 AfroPoP: The Ultimate Cultural Exchange
 America ReFramed
 DW News
 The Day
 NHK Newsline
 Doc World
 Local, USA
 Stories from the Stage

Public Square programming block
Global Watch

Affiliates

World is carried by the following stations:

References

External links

 

Commercial-free television networks
Public Broadcasting Service
Public television in the United States
Television networks in the United States
Television channels and stations established in 2006
English-language television stations in the United States
2006 establishments in the United States